Stari Log is a settlement south of Pragersko in the Municipality of Slovenska Bistrica in northeastern Slovenia. The main railway line from Ljubljana to Maribor runs through the settlement. The area is part of the traditional region of Styria. It is now included with the rest of the municipality in the Drava Statistical Region.

References

External links
Stari Log at Geopedia

Populated places in the Municipality of Slovenska Bistrica